The Chinese Taipei national ice hockey team is the national men's ice hockey team of the Republic of China (Taiwan). The team is controlled by the Chinese Taipei Ice Hockey Federation and a member of the International Ice Hockey Federation (IIHF). Chinese Taipei is currently ranked 46th in the IIHF World Ranking and competes in the IIHF World Championship Division III.

History
Chinese Taipei has only been active in 1987, 2005, 2008 and 2010. In 1987, they competed unofficially in the World Championship Pool D in Perth, Australia where their best result was a 2–2 draw against Hong Kong. Chinese Taipei was not a member of the IIHF at the time, but showed up to the tournament anyway, and was allowed to play one game against each other team. In 2005, they played 3 friendlies, losing to Hong Kong once, 6–2 and defeating Thailand twice, 5–3 and 11–4. In 2008, they won the inaugural Challenge Cup of Asia held in Hong Kong. In 2009, they failed to send a team to the tournament and in April 2010, they hosted the tournament (now recognized by the IIHF) and won it again.

As with other sports teams, under political opposition from the People's Republic of China, the Republic of China has competed under the "Chinese Taipei" banner as a result of the 1979 Nagoya Resolution.

Tournament record

World Championships

Asian Winter Games

Challenge Cup of Asia

All-time record against other nations
Last match update: 22 April 2018

Note: Chinese Taipei was awarded a 5–0 win over Bosnia and Herzegovina in the 2017 IIHF World Championship Division III after Bosnia and Herzegovina forfeited the game.

References

External links

IIHF profile
National Teams of Ice Hockey

Ice hockey in Taiwan
National ice hockey teams in Asia
Ice hockey